ABC Northern Tasmania (call sign: 7NT) is the ABC Local Radio station for northern Tasmania, based in Launceston, owned by the Australian Broadcasting Corporation. It broadcasts on the frequency of 91.7 MHz on the FM band from Mount Barrow at a power of 192 kW which covers much of Northern Tasmania.

In addition, the station has many low power repeater stations across the state including:
 Bicheno 89.7 MHz
 Burnie 102.5 MHz
 Devonport 100.5 MHz
 Fingal 1161 kHz AM
 King Island 88.6 MHz
 Lileah 91.3 MHz
 Queenstown/Zeehan 90.5 MHz
 Rosebery 106.3 MHz
 Savage River 104.1 MHz
 St Helens 1584 kHz AM
 St Marys 102.7 MHz
 Strahan 107.6 MHz
 Swansea 106.1 MHz
 Waratah 103.3 MHz
 Weldborough 97.3 MHz
 Launceston CBD 102.7 MHz

History
ABC Northern Tasmania was the ABC radio's first regional station in Launceston. It was opened by Prime Minister Joseph Lyons on 3 August 1935.

7NT moved from AM (711 kHz) to FM (91.7 MHz) in 2006.

References

Northern Tasmania
Radio stations in Tasmania